Carolina Engman (born 5 March 1987) is a Swedish fashion blogger, model and stylist. Engman started her blog entitled 'FashionSquad' in April 2006. She has been featured by magazines like Teen Vogue, NYLON Japan, Vogue Girl Korea, Vogue Germany and Elle Spain.

Carolina has modeled in campaigns for Botkier, Mango, Penny Black, Bik Bok, and Nastygal. In 2010 she was featured on a T-shirt sold by Forever 21.

See also
La Carmina
Glamourina
Karla Deras

References

External links
Fashionsquad.com

Living people
1987 births
Swedish female models
Swedish bloggers
Fashion stylists
Swedish women bloggers